Pulur may be:
Gökçedere, Demirözü, formerly known as Pulur, a town in Bayburt Province, Turkey
Ovacık, Dersim, also known as Pulur, a town in Tunceli Province, Turkey
Polur, Iran, a village in Iran

See also 
 Pullur (disambiguation)
 Polur (disambiguation)